Hubert Bruce Logan (2 March 1886 – 24 November 1965) was a British rower who competed in the 1912 Summer Olympics.

Life
Logan was born at Chesterton, Cambridge, the son of John Maxwell Samuel Logan and his wife Alice Mary Bullard. He became a member of Thames Rowing Club and in 1909 and 1911 was a member of the crew that won the Stewards' Challenge Cup at Henley Royal Regatta. Also in the 1911 regatta, Logan and Charles Rought dead heated in a heat of Silver Goblets against the eventual winners Julius Beresford and Arthur Cloutte to set a course record which lasted until 1934. A year later in 1912 Rought and Logan won Silver Goblets. He was the strokeman of the Thames Rowing Club coxed four which won the silver medal for Great Britain rowing at the 1912 Summer Olympics.

Achievements

Olympic Games
 1912 – Silver, Coxed Four

Henley Royal Regatta
 1909 – Stewards' Challenge Cup
 1911 – Stewards' Challenge Cup
 1912 – Silver Goblets & Nickalls' Challenge Cup (with Charles Rought)
 1919 Victory Regatta – Fawley Cup

References

External links
profile

1886 births
1965 deaths
English male rowers
British male rowers
Olympic rowers of Great Britain
Rowers at the 1912 Summer Olympics
Olympic silver medallists for Great Britain
Olympic medalists in rowing
Medalists at the 1912 Summer Olympics
People from Chesterton, Cambridge